Egesina monticola is a species of beetle in the family Cerambycidae. It was described by Warren Samuel Fisher in 1936.

References

Egesina
Beetles described in 1936